Moskovskaya Komsomolka  was a satirical newspaper published weekly in Russia (1999-2001). The newspaper had a fixed 32 page layout.

History
Founded by Boris Berezovsky and Yevgeny Dodolev, it featured investigative journalism and leaks from sources inside the Russian business world, as well as a large number of  cartoons. Its history saw a number of stunts. It published so-called "leaks" from administration officials, including information from whistle-blowers. 

Oleg Mitvol gave the newspaper its name.

In September 1999 the first issue was published.

Valeriya Novodvorskaya said that it was most provocative newspaper in Russia.

Although the Moskovskaya Komsomolka never lost its touches of humor, it soon established itself as a pre-eminent forum for serious journalism.

The Moskovskaya Komsomolka writers include:
Dmitrii Bykov
Sergey Dorenko
Marina Lesko
Eduard Limonov

See also
The eXile
Alexander Nevzorov

References

External links
  

1999 establishments in Russia
2001 disestablishments in Russia
Defunct newspapers published in Russia
Defunct weekly newspapers
Mass media in Moscow
Publications established in 1999
Publications disestablished in 2001
Russian-language newspapers published in Russia